This article gives details of the official charts from 2004. The year was special for many successful artists, including Eminem, Britney Spears, Scissor Sisters, Usher, Natasha Bedingfield, Jamelia, Franz Ferdinand, Green Day and The Streets.

Summary of UK chart activity
The year started with the 2003 Christmas number one single topping the first chart of the year.  This was followed by Michelle McManus, the winner of the second British series of Pop Idol with her first single release it topped the charts for 3 weeks. Second and third place contestants Mark Rhodes and Sam Nixon formed a duo, whose debut single was a cover of the Beatles song, "With a Little Help from My Friends", which also reached the No.1 spot.

On 9 March Westlife became a four piece after Brian McFadden decided to leave the band. His final single with the band was "Obvious" which peaked at No.3 in February; the remaining members Shane Filan, Mark Feehily, Nicky Byrne, and Kian Egan, went on to further success without McFadden.

In April, Eamon achieved the number one spot with a song with more profanities than any other hit single; it stayed at number one for 4 weeks.  In another first the answer song by Frankee replaced the original single at the top of the charts and stayed there for 3 weeks despite selling less than half as many copies as Eamon.  Both artists released follow-up songs but neither performed well, relegating the pair to one-hit wonder status.

A new version of "Alltogethernow" by The Farm was released to mark the Euro 2004 football tournament – it reached number five on 13 June with Come On England, a remake of Come On Eileen (Dexys Midnight Runners) by 4-4-2, reaching number two.

The UK Official Download Chart began at the start of September, the first number 1 being Flying Without Wings by Westlife. U2 released their single Vertigo on music download services weeks before it came out on CD. It stayed at number one for 8 non-consecutive weeks on the download chart. While illegal sharing of music over the Internet had been popular for a number of years the music industry started creating new, pay-per-download services, which were very well received.  Charting companies soon took notice and various download charts appeared on radio and television.  The use and increased popularity of iPods also helped to promote download services, and Apple's online iTunes Music Store launched in the UK in June, selling over 450,000 songs in the first week. Downloads began to be introduced into the main singles chart in 2005, although not fully until the beginning of 2007.

Albums by Dido, Katie Melua and Norah Jones dominated the first three months of the year.  In May and June, Keane twice returned to the top of the charts with their album Hopes and Fears.  The Scissor Sisters, The Streets and Maroon 5 also enjoyed great success with their albums.  Numerous acts released greatest hits albums with Robbie Williams' being most successful, selling over one million copies in eight weeks.

Popular artists from the 1980s made successful returns with Duran Duran, The Cure, Depeche Mode and Morrissey releasing top ten singles.  After appearing in the reality television show I'm a Celebrity, Get Me Out of Here!, Peter Andre re-released his 1996 hit single Mysterious Girl, this time getting to the top spot.

In September and October Eric Prydz "Call on me" stayed at number one for five non-consecutive weeks and staying in the chart for a further 14 weeks.

In October the music industry mourned the loss of John Peel, the Radio 1 DJ famous for championing new bands and musical styles.

20 years after the original, the Band Aid single Do They Know It's Christmas? was re-recorded and became a massive success, easily selling the most singles of the year, and holding the Christmas number 1 spot.  The second week of release saw the song sell almost as many as the first, pushing it to half a million in less than 14 days. This was all additional to the number of legal downloads as the song topped that chart as well. The song had sold over a million copies in a month.

Artists who narrowly missed out on number ones were Kelis whose Milkshake peaked at number two for 4 weeks in January and February and "Trick Me" in June. Other acts were Anastacia with Left Outside Alone who peaked at number three but was the seventh best selling of the year staying on the chart for 18 weeks. Also the long-awaited return of Destiny's Child came in November when they peaked at number two for 4 weeks with Lose My Breath the first single released of their album "Destiny Fulfilled".

On the issue date of 7 November, the top five consisted of all American performers/acts.
 #1. Eminem – Just Lose It
 #2. Destiny's Child – Lose My Breath
 #3. Britney Spears – My Prerogative
 #4. Christina Aguilera & Missy Elliott – Car Wash
 #5. Usher & Alicia Keys – My Boo

This broke a record in UK chart history. The No. 6 was also held by an American act, Ja Rule featuring. Ashanti & R. Kelly with Wonderful.

The most successful acts of 2004 were McFly whose first two debut singles entered at number one and they had two other top five hits later in the year. Natasha Bedingfield topped the singles, album and download charts. Britney Spears and Usher returned to the charts and had two number ones each (Toxic and Yeah! respectively) and another top five hits each. Girls Aloud also had big hits with songs including "The Show", "Love Machine" which both peaked at No. 2, and the 2004 Children in Need No. 1 single "I'll Stand by You". Former S Club star Rachel Stevens continued on with her solo career in this year too, reaching the top 3 once again with Sport Relief track "Some Girls" and a cover of Andrea True Connection's "More, More, More".

Charts

Number-one singles

Number-one downloads

Number-one albums

Number-one compilation albums

Year-end charts
Between 28 December 2003 and 1 January 2005.

Best-selling singles

Best-selling albums

Best-selling compilations

Notes:

Total album sales of 2004
Total sales for albums in 2004 amounted to 163,405,658.

See also
List of UK Dance Singles Chart number ones of 2004
List of UK Independent Singles Chart number ones of 2004
List of UK Rock & Metal Singles Chart number ones of 2004

References

 Top 200 singles of 2004

 
British record charts
United Kingdom